Montalbano Elicona (Sicilian: Muntarbanu) is a comune (municipality) in the Metropolitan City of Messina in the Italian region Sicily, located about  east of Palermo and about  southwest of Messina on the Nebrodi mountains at the border with the Peloritani range.

It is  mainly known for the castle built in 1233 by the Emperor Frederick II, the medieval architecture of its streets, the megaliths of Argimusco, and the natural wood of Malabotta.
 
Montalbano Elicona borders the following municipalities: Basicò, Falcone, Floresta, Francavilla di Sicilia, Librizzi, Malvagna, Oliveri, Patti, Raccuja, Roccella Valdemone, San Piero Patti, Santa Domenica Vittoria, Tripi.

Public transport

Railways 
Montalbano Elicona is reachable by train: 
Falcone railway station is located 19,5 km away
Novara-Montalbano-Furnari is located 23,8 km away.
Both are on the Palermo–Messina railway and they are served by trains run by Trenitalia, including services from Messina. Outside of the stations is available a Uber service by App.

Bus and tram 
Montalbano Elicona is served by bus provided from Azienda Siciliana Trasporti.

References

External links
 Official website

Cities and towns in Sicily
Hilltowns in Sicily